Equalization is a step in property taxation to bring a uniformity to tax assessment levels across different geographical areas or classes of properties.  Equalization is usually in the form of a uniform percentage of increase or decrease to each area or class of property.

Attempts at explicit equalization in tax assessments date back at least as early as 1799.

See also
 Fair market value

References

Evaluation methods
Equalization
Tax law